Siphiwe Ignatius Mkhonza (born 2 January 1979 in Springs, Gauteng) is a South African soccer player who played as a centre-back. He played club football for Bloemfontein Celtic, Ria Stars, Lamontville Golden Arrows, Kaizer Chiefs, SuperSport United, Maritzburg United, AmaZulu and Black Leopards and won seven caps for the South Africa national soccer team.

Early life
Mkhonza was born in Kwa-Thema, Springs, to his parents Mavis Motsile and Joseph Mkhonza. His father, Joseph Mkhonza, is the former head coach of the South Africa women's national soccer team and coached the team at the 2012 Summer Olympics. Siphiwe attended Thulisa Primary School and would go on to attend Kenneth Masekela Secondary School.

Mkhonza played for several clubs as a youth starting his playing days at Skheshes Babes, and then going on to play for Tip Top FC, Lusitano FC, Munich FC and Katlehong City. These pivotal days would prove vital as he was able to adapt to many situations in his playing days.

Club career

Bloemfontein Celtic
Mkhonza's began his professional football career at Bloemfontein Celtic F.C. in 1999 and stayed there until 2001. He would also captain his team at the age of 18 years old in his first season. In the 1999–2000 Premier Soccer League season, Mkhonza would lead his team to the biggest home win of the season, beating Mother City F.C. 6–0.

Ria Stars
Joining next the Pietersburg based club, Ria Stars, who were promoted in the previous season, Mkhonza would prove that his leadership qualities were acknowledged as he would captain the team in the 2001-2002 campaign and make 30 appearances.

Golden Arrows
After a lacklustre season with new boys, Ria Stars, Mkhonza was keen on proving his value as he moved to Durban-based club, Lamontville Golden Arrows F.C. He would spend two seasons here, with him bringing the team from 13th position on the log in the previous season to 5th on the log in his first season with the club, also going on to captain them. Mkhonza played all but one game in his two seasons.

Kaizer Chiefs
In arguably his most successful stint with any club, Mkhonza made the big move to Soweto giants Kaizer Chiefs F.C. from 2004–2007. In his first season he would achieve greatness by winning his first league title in the 2004–05 Premier Soccer League campaign. His move to the Glamour Boys would see Mkhonza receive his first South Africa national soccer team call up and game.

Maritzburg United
Dr. Mnandi moved to a struggling Maritzburg United F.C. with the intention of reviving the club. He also captained the Team of Choice and saved them from relegation. Mkhonza would only stay for one season at the Pietermaritzburg outfit before moving on.

AmaZulu
Choosing to stay in KwaZulu-Natal, Siphiwe then had a fruitful stint at AmaZulu F.C. While playing in a more senior role for the Durban-based outfit, he would help them to a Nedbank Cup final (losing 3–0 to Bidvest Wits F.C.) and get the club into the top 8 for the first time.

References

1979 births
Living people
South African soccer players
South Africa international soccer players
People from Springs, Gauteng
Sportspeople from Gauteng
Association football central defenders
Bloemfontein Celtic F.C. players
Ria Stars F.C. players
Lamontville Golden Arrows F.C. players
Kaizer Chiefs F.C. players
SuperSport United F.C. players
Maritzburg United F.C. players
AmaZulu F.C. players
Black Leopards F.C. players